Antelope Valley High School is located in Lancaster, California, and is part of the Antelope Valley Union High School District, in northernmost Los Angeles County, California.  It was founded in 1912, and had its first graduating class in 1912. It is located near the western edge of the Mojave Desert.  At the time of its founding, classes were held at the Women's Independence Hall on Cedar Ave. and Lancaster Blvd. (then called West Tenth Street) until a permanent building could be built. In July 1914, construction was planned to begin on a concrete building, Central Hall, but construction didn’t begin until 1915 and was completed in mid-1915. However, a strike over unpaid wages prevented students from entering the new building at the beginning of the 1915 school year. It was settled, and students began their classes in the new building in October 1915. The school was a residential boarding school serving students from farms and ranches from north Los Angeles and south Kern counties. At present, the school primarily serves the population of Lancaster, California.

Notable alumni
Kevin Appier, former MLB pitcher
Priscilla Barnes, actress of Three's Company
Captain Beefheart (Don Van Vliet), singer, songwriter, musician, painter
Lon Boyett, former NFL player
Steve Chilcott, number one pick in the 1966 Major League Baseball draft
Sean Douglass, former MLB pitcher
Judy Garland, actress
Mike Gaechter, former Dallas Cowboys defensive back.
Bruce Hill, former Tampa Bay Buccaneers wide receiver
Al Krueger, former NFL player
Terence McKenna, a writer, philosopher, and ethnobotanist.
Dwayne Murphy, former MLB centerfielder
James Richards, former Canadian Football League offensive guard
Jim Slaton, former Milwaukee Brewers pitcher, current bullpen coach, Seattle Mariners.
Alex St. Clair, musician best known as founding member of The Magic Band
Vern Valdez, former NFL player
Marcy Walker, soap opera actress
Frank Zappa, musician, composer, activist and filmmaker

References

External links
 
 Antelope Valley Union High School District website

High schools in Los Angeles County, California
Education in Lancaster, California
Public high schools in California
 
1912 establishments in California
Educational institutions established in 1912